Events in the year 2007 in Ukraine.

Incumbents
President: Viktor Yushchenko
Prime Minister: Viktor Yanukovych (until 18 December), Yulia Tymoshenko (starting 18 December)

Events

Births

Deaths
January 17 - Yevhen Kushnaryov, deputy of Verkhovna Rada, accidental shooting

References

 
2000s in Ukraine
Years of the 21st century in Ukraine
Ukraine
Ukraine